Thomas Dekalb Beasley  (1904 – 1988) was a politician in Florida. He served several terms and was a Speaker of the Florida House of Representatives. He was a Democrat and represented Walton County, Florida.

He spoke on financial support for elderly Floridians.

References

External links
Findagrave entry

1904 births
1988 deaths
Speakers of the Florida House of Representatives
Democratic Party members of the Florida House of Representatives
People from Walton County, Florida